Je vous salue, mafia! (Mafia, I Salute You) is a 1965 French Italian film directed by Raoul Lévy. It was released in Italy as Mafia, Yo Te Saludo.

Cast
Eddie Constantine as Rudy
Henry Silva as Schaft
Jack Klugman as Phil
Elsa Martinelli as Sylvia
Micheline Presle as Daisy
Michael Lonsdale as Secretary
Carl Studer as Ruidosa
Ricky Cooper as Ben
Tener Eckelberry as Hyman

External links
 

1965 films
1965 crime films
French crime films
Italian crime films
1960s Italian-language films
English-language French films
English-language Italian films
1960s Italian films
1960s French films